Austronecydalopsis is a genus of beetles in the family Cerambycidae, containing the following species:

 Austronecydalopsis curkovici Barriga & Cepeda, 2007
 Austronecydalopsis iridipennis (Fairmaire & Germain, 1864)

References

Necydalopsini